This is a list of homicides committed by firearms in the state of California which have a Wikipedia article for the killing, the killer, or a related subject.

See also 
 List of homicides in California
 List of shootings in Colorado
 List of shootings in Florida
 List of shootings in New York (state)
 List of shootings in Texas
 North Hollywood shootout

California-related lists
Crime in California
 
Lists of shootings by location